Shahkrit Yamnam (born 25 June 1978 in Bangkok, Thailand) is a Thai film and television actor. He has acted in numerous popular lakorns, sitcoms and commercials. He is also credited under the stage names Shahkrit Yamnarm, Charkrit Ngamengarm and Krit.

Biography 
He was born in Bangkok, Thailand, started his preschool education at Peterpan School, moved to Bangkok International Preparatory School and studied there until Grade 9 before studying abroad in New Zealand for 3 years, and later in the US where he earned his undergraduate or bachelor's degree education at International Correspondence School (ICS), USA. There, he majored in Marketing.

Chakrit's first appearances were fashion pictures in Angel and Thoe Kub Chan magazine in the 90s. He has hosted television programs such as TeenTalk and e for teens, as well as singing on the album Teentrax, making the song "ไม่รู้จะเลือกใคร" highly popular at the time. He was cast in many high-rated lakorns, television series, movies, and sitcoms.

His films include Destiny Upside Down (1997) with Jesdaporn Pholdee and Sonia Couling, O-Negative (1998) with Tata Young, directed by Yuthlert Sippapak. In addition, Chakrit has starred in international films, including Belly of the Beast with Steven Seagal and Bangkok Dangerous with Nicolas Cage.

He is well-known 'foodie critic', he is also a host on the cooking show Krua Laew Tae Krit, Thai-Korean cooking show The Team Chef and was a host of Iron Chef Thailand.

Filmography

Television

Weekly Syndication

Master of Ceremony: MC ON TV

Awards

References

External links
 
 Shahkrit Yamnarm at the Thai Film Database
 Chakrit Yamnam at GMMStar

1975 births
Living people
Shahkrit Yamnam
Shahkrit Yamnam
Shahkrit Yamnam
Shahkrit Yamnam
Shahkrit Yamnam
Shahkrit Yamnam
Shahkrit Yamnam
Thai television personalities
Shahkrit Yamnam
Shahkrit Yamnam